Aishath Shiranee (born 16 January 1975) is a Maldivian former film actress. Shiranee is the recipient of several awards, including one Gaumee Film Award and three Aafathis Awards. In 2001, the Government of Maldives honoured her with the National Award of Recognition.

Career
While working in a job at Maldives Customs Service, Shiranee made her screen debut with a video single titled "Hithaa Roohun Asaru Kuranee" alongside Ahmed Ghiyas which was followed by several other video songs before making her film debut with the film Naseebu (1992).

Apart from the Abdulla Shujau directed drama film Nafrathu (1994), Shiranee starred in the Arifa Ibrahim-directed family drama Manzil (1994) which portrays her as an intelligent and hardworking orphan, whose life takes a dramatic turn while working as a servant in a reputed family. The same year, she starred in Ali Waheed-directed Kulunu which fetched her first Gaumee Film Award for Best Supporting Actress. She also appeared in a Television Maldives production, Fun Asaru (1996) which follows two women; one searching for her mother and one fighting cancer. Her performance in the second half of the film received positive reviews from critics.

Mariyam Shauqee's widely acclaimed family drama television series Kahthiri was released in 1997; here Shiranee played the role of a TV presenter living in a congested housing complex while dealing with various social issues. The same year, she played the role of a blind girl in Abdulla Sujau-directed Laila (1997), followed by her collaboration with Ahmed Mohamed Didi for his crime thriller film, Heelaiy (1997). An unofficial remake of Abbas–Mustan's Bollywood film Baazigar (1993), she played dual roles of a young woman who is murdered by a clever man and the sister seeking revenge on the assault.

In 2000, she played the role of a factory manager who gets meddled in a love affair of two friends, in Ahmed Nimal's family drama Sababu. She next starred in the film Rihun (2000) opposite Ismail Wajeeh which received mixed reviews from critics. This was followed by the year's most successful Maldivian film, Ahmed Nimal's horror classic Zalzalaa, in which Shiranee portrays a jinn who enthralls a middle-aged man.

One of the most successful films from her career, Fathimath Nahula's romantic film Kalaayaanulaa was released in 2003 which follows a happily married couple (played by Yoosuf Shafeeu and Shiranee) where the husband decided to marry his childhood best friend (played by Niuma Mohamed) when his wife fails to sexually please him. The film received widespread critical acclaim and was declared to be year's highest grossing Maldivian film release. Her portrayal of the unfortunate first wife, garnered her a Miadhu Crystal Award for Best Supporting Actress and a Gaumee Film Award for Best Supporting Actress nomination

Media image
Shiranee is considered among the most popular and high-profile celebrities in Maldives. Analysing her career, Aishath Maaha from Avas wrote: "Emotional, Joyful or Envious, Shiranee fits perfectly to all roles and all her performances can easily be graded with full marks".

Filmography

Feature film

Television

Accolades

References 

Living people
People from Malé
21st-century Maldivian actresses
Maldivian film actresses
1975 births